Gerberga of Lower Lorraine (975-1019), Countess of Louvain, was the daughter of Charles, Duke of Lower Lorraine, himself the son of Louis IV of France and Gerberga of Saxony. Her mother was Adelaide/Agnes de Vermandois.

Personal life
She married Lambert I, Count of Louvain and they had:
 Henry I
 Lambert II
 Matilda  (also called Maud), who married Eustace I, Count of Boulogne
 Reginar

References

Sources

10th-century births
11th-century deaths
10th-century French nobility
10th-century French women
11th-century French nobility
11th-century French women
10th-century German nobility
10th-century German women
11th-century German nobility
11th-century German women